Oktyabrsky is a rural locality (a khutor) in Gorodensky Selsoviet Rural Settlement, Lgovsky District, Kursk Oblast, Russia. Population:

Geography 
The khutor is located in the Seym River basin, 51 km from the Russia–Ukraine border, 55 km south-west of Kursk, 10.5 km east of the district center – the town Lgov, 3 km from the selsoviet center – Gorodensk.

 Climate
Oktyabrsky has a warm-summer humid continental climate (Dfb in the Köppen climate classification).

Transport 
Oktyabrsky is located 5.5 km from the road of regional importance  (Kursk – Lgov – Rylsk – border with Ukraine) as part of the European route E38, on the road of intermunicipal significance  (Lgov – Gorodensk – Borisovka – Rechitsa), 5.5 km from the nearest railway halt 412 km (railway line Lgov I — Kursk).

The rural locality is situated 61 km from Kursk Vostochny Airport, 138 km from Belgorod International Airport and 265 km from Voronezh Peter the Great Airport.

References

Notes

Sources

Rural localities in Lgovsky District